High Treason (German: Hochverrat) is a 1929 German silent drama film directed by Johannes Meyer and starring Gerda Maurus, Gustav Fröhlich and Harry Hardt. The film is set in pre-Revolution Russia. Maurus' performance was contrasted favourably with her appearance in Fritz Lang's Woman in the Moon by the magazine Film und Volk. The film's art direction was by Willi Herrmann.

Cast
 Gerda Maurus as Vera 
 Gustav Fröhlich as Wassil Gurmai 
 Harry Hardt as Fürst Iwan Stolin 
 Olga Engl as Fürstin Stolin seine Mutter 
 Leopold von Ledebur as Grossfürst Kyrill, der Governeur 
 Rudolf Biebrach as Oberst Petroff 
 Ossip Darmatow as Graf Starschenski 
 Félix de Pomés as Nimirski 
 Harry Frank as Pawel

References

Bibliography
 Kreimeier, Klaus. The Ufa Story: A History of Germany's Greatest Film Company, 1918-1945. University of California Press, 1999.

External links

1929 films
Films of the Weimar Republic
1929 drama films
German silent feature films
German drama films
Films directed by Johannes Meyer
Films set in Russia
Films set in the 1910s
UFA GmbH films
German black-and-white films
Silent drama films
1920s German films
1920s German-language films